Lee Seung-hoon (Hangul: 이승훈, Hanja: , ; born 6 March 1988) is a South Korean speed skater. He won a gold medal in the 10,000 metres, a silver medal in the 5000 meters at the 2010 Winter Olympics, becoming the first and only Asian man ever to achieve these feats, a gold medal in mass-start at the 2018 Winter Olympics, a gold medal in the mass start at the 2016 World Championships in Kolomna, and a bronze medal in mass-start at the 2022 Winter Olympics. He was a short track speed skater, winning the 2008 World Championship 3000 m super-final and three gold medals at the 2009 Winter Universiade. Lee converted to long track in September 2009, as he failed to earn his spot on the South Korea national short track team in the national trials.

Early life 
Lee Seung-hoon started skating in first grade at Lila Elementary School. However, when the Asian Financial Crisis hit South Korea, his father's business failed in 1998 when he was in the fourth grade. Lee's parents tried to get their son to give up skating because they could no longer afford the training fee. Although they sold their car, Lee insisted on continuing skating and went to the ice rink by bus. Lee was a short track speed skater at Sinmonk High School and Korea National Sport University, but the competition between skaters was very high. Lee was evaluated as a rising rookie but could not surpass Ahn Hyun-Soo and Lee Ho-Suk.

Lee faced a wall after not being selected as a national player in the South Korean national competition held in April 2009. Since Lee was expected to become one of the national skaters, his frustration over the result could have led him to give up skating. However, after long consideration, Lee declared in front of his family that he would switch to long track speed skating. Lee assumed he could at least become a candidate in the other genre even though Choi Geun-won was considered the long track speed skater expected to represent South Korea. Lee excelled, skating a record of 6 minutes 48 seconds and defeating Choi to become a South Korean national skater.

Lee has been close friends with gold medalists Mo Tae-bum and Lee Sang-hwa since they were in grade school. In speed skating at the 2010 Winter Olympics, Mo won the gold medal in the men's 500-meter race and took silver in the 1000-meter race, while Lee Sang-hwa won the women's 500 meters.

Career 

One of Lee's first major international competitions was at the 2009 Winter Universiade in Harbin, China. Lee captured three gold medals in short track speed skating in the 1000, 1500 and 3000 metre events, a feat only bettered by countryman Sung Si-Bak during the 2007 Winter Universiade in Turin, Italy, winning every distance, the 500, 1000, 1500, 3000 and 5000 m relay.  Despite his successes, Lee shocked many observers by failing to earn a spot on South Korea's national short track team in April 2009. Later that year, in September, Lee switched from short track to long track speed skating.

On 4 January 2010, in an interview with Arirang, Lee was quoted during an interview as saying: "I would like to tear down the barriers and show the world that Asians can excel in the speed skating program, too, not just in the short track program." Most commentators pointed out that at the time no Asian had ever won a medal in long distance speed skating categories at the Olympics. Relatively obscure in his new field, Lee surprised everyone by finishing the men's 5000 meters in a time of 6 minutes, 16.95 seconds at the 2010 Winter Olympics, placing second only behind Sven Kramer of the Netherlands who clocked in at 6 minutes, 14.60 seconds. He then went on to win the gold medal in the 10000 meter final after Kramer was disqualified for finishing in the wrong lane. Lee stated afterward: "My coaches told me at first that Kramer had made a mistake, and I saw it on the replay they were showing on the big screen. I want to compete with Kramer again."

In 2021, Lee signed a contract with IHQ.

Records

Personal records

Olympic records

Olympic Games
7 medals – (2 gold, 3 silver, 1 bronze)

References

External links 

 
 
 

1988 births
Living people
South Korean male speed skaters
South Korean male short track speed skaters
Olympic medalists in speed skating
Olympic gold medalists for South Korea
Olympic silver medalists for South Korea
Olympic bronze medalists for South Korea
Olympic speed skaters of South Korea
Speed skaters at the 2010 Winter Olympics
Speed skaters at the 2014 Winter Olympics
Speed skaters at the 2018 Winter Olympics
Speed skaters at the 2022 Winter Olympics
Medalists at the 2010 Winter Olympics
Medalists at the 2014 Winter Olympics
Medalists at the 2018 Winter Olympics
Medalists at the 2022 Winter Olympics
Asian Games medalists in speed skating
Asian Games gold medalists for South Korea
Asian Games silver medalists for South Korea
Speed skaters at the 2011 Asian Winter Games
Speed skaters at the 2017 Asian Winter Games
Medalists at the 2011 Asian Winter Games
Medalists at the 2017 Asian Winter Games
Universiade medalists in short track speed skating
Medalists at the 2007 Winter Universiade
World Single Distances Speed Skating Championships medalists
World Short Track Speed Skating Championships medalists
Speed skaters from Seoul
Universiade gold medalists for South Korea
Universiade silver medalists for South Korea
Universiade bronze medalists for South Korea
Competitors at the 2007 Winter Universiade
Competitors at the 2009 Winter Universiade